Georgia Olive Cozzini (February 14, 1915 – October 10, 1983) was an American socialist politician. She is best remembered as the first woman to run for Governor of Wisconsin and for two consecutive runs as the Vice Presidential candidate of the Socialist Labor Party of America, appearing on the ballot in 1956 and 1960.

Biography

Early years 
Georgia Cozzini was born Georgia Olive Purvis on February 14, 1915 in Springfield, Missouri.

She married Artemio Cozzini, who invented the hollow-cup knife grinding machine, in 1936 and the pair settled in Artemio's hometown, Milwaukee, Wisconsin. The couple had two children, Bruce (1936-2022) and Gina (born 1945).

Political career 

Cozzini was an active member of the Socialist Labor Party (SLP). She was the first woman to run for Governor of Wisconsin, heading the state SLP ticket in 1942. She ran for this office again in 1970 and 1974.

Cozzini ran twice for the United States Senate in Wisconsin, appearing as part of the SLP slate in 1946 and again in 1958.

Cozzini was twice the nominee of the SLP for Vice President of the United States, running in 1956 and 1960 on the  ticket with Eric Hass, editor of the SLP's national newspaper, The Weekly People.

Death and legacy 
Georgia Cozzini died on October 10, 1983.  As requested, members of her family spread her ashes on the Northern Wisconsin Lake, where the family had spent many summers vacationing.

References

External links 
 Georgia Cozzini, . Video. Retrieved February 18, 2010.
 Georgia Cozzini: A Socialist Heart

1915 births
1983 deaths
1956 United States vice-presidential candidates
1960 United States vice-presidential candidates
Women in Wisconsin politics
Female candidates for Vice President of the United States
Politicians from Springfield, Missouri
Politicians from Milwaukee
20th-century American women politicians
20th-century American politicians
Socialist Labor Party of America politicians from Wisconsin